Following Muhammad: Rethinking Islam in the Contemporary World is a 2003 book by Carl W. Ernst about the situation of Islam in contemporary world. It has received several international awards, including the 2004 Bashrahil Prize for Outstanding Cultural Achievement.

References

External links 
 Following Muhammad: Rethinking Islam in the Contemporary World

2003 non-fiction books
English-language books